Fill in the Bank is a Philippine game show broadcast on TV5, presented by comedians Jose Manalo and Pokwang. The program premiered on the network's Todo Max Panalo block on August 15, 2020, originally airing Mondays, Wednesdays, and Fridays at 7:30 pm alternating with its companion program, Bawal Na Game Show, also a blocktime production of Archangel Media.

From October 12 to December 10, 2020, Fill in the Bank moved to its new timeslot in primetime at 7 p.m. preceding Bawal Na Game Show at 8 p.m., both airing back-to-back episodes on a Monday-Tuesday-Thursday schedule to make way for the influx of new programming at TV5 (and the coverage of the 2020 PBA season) which will take over the primetime timeslot for Wednesdays and Fridays.

From December 14, 2020 to February 17, 2021, the show extends to five nights from Mondays to Fridays.

On February 22, 2021, the show was aired every Mondays, Wednesdays and Fridays (which was returned to the original airtime, four months ago) starting on an earlier timeslot at 5:00 PM alternating with its companion program Bawal Na Game Show which will be aired every Tuesdays and Thursdays before Frontline Pilipinas.

On March 31, 2021, the program concluded and was replaced by Sing Galing!

Cast

Hosts
 "Manedyer" Jose Manalo as the CEO, Chief Echuserong Officer 
 "Madam Poky" Pokwang as the CFO, Chismosang Falakang Officer

Featuring
 Alexa Miro as Bank Teller Alexa
 Hershey Neri as Bank Teller Hershey
 CJ Hirro as Sirit
 Tuesday Vargas as Teller Trainee
 Benjie Paras as Delivery Guy Tiny
 Gardo Versoza as Eggpie / Cupcake
 Wilma Doesnt as Wilma Does
 Teri Onor as Terri Yakki
 Sam YG as Samir Samir
 Boobsie Wonderland as Boobsie
 Jerald Napoles as Tom Gutz
 Kris Bernal

Format
Two contestants vie for the chance to win big bucks in the "Juan Bank" and make it all the way to the jackpot round in order to keep their earnings. The four rounds of games the contestants go through are the following:
 Enter Your Pin Code - Correctly go through the process of withdrawing money at the ATM (Ayuda 'Teh Machine) within two minutes, with the correct debit card of their choice and corresponding pin. The cards are divided into three pools: 1 out of 4 bronze cards worth P10,000, 1 out of 6 silver cards worth P20,000, and 1 out of 8 gold cards worth P30,000. The maximum prize possible is P60,000.
 Deposit Silip - A guessing game in which contestants try to guess the amount of the money banks by each person or owner presented as close as they can without going overboard. The maximum prize is set at P50,000.
 Coin/Gold Rush - Similar to Eat Bulagas former segments such as Hakot All You Can and Hakot Pa More!, the contestants try to race against time while gathering as much coins as they can using only their hands and arms. After one minute, the weight of their gathered coins (in kilograms) will be multiplied by P1,000 and added to their earnings. If either one goes a rare special variable, he/she will has his money doubled.
 Jackpot Round: Huli Cash - Similar to Eat Bulagas Lucky Truck (based on Wowowees Cash Motto and the Wowowillie & Wowowin segment Cash Salo), pieces of confetti (bills) worth the value of their previous earnings are sent flying in a wind chamber (deemed as the "bank vault"), all up for the lone contestant to collect within one minute, with a single blue bill included worth an extra P10,000. The maximum prize is set at P150,000.

The consolation prize for the losing contestant after round 3 is set at P15,000.

Former
 Cheque or X - A guessing game in which contestants try to guess the retail value of the items or services presented as close as they can without going overboard. The maximum prize is set at P50,000.

Episodes
Season 1

See also
 List of programs broadcast by TV5 (Philippine TV network)
 Kapatid Channel

Notes

References

External links

TV5 (Philippine TV network) original programming
Philippine game shows
2020 Philippine television series debuts
2021 Philippine television series endings
2020s game shows
Filipino-language television shows
Television series by Cignal Entertainment